Scuola Svizzera di Roma (translation: Swiss School of Rome) is an international school with an innovative, holistic pedagogy and leads to the Swiss Matura. In addition, permeability to the Italian education system is guaranteed from kindergarten to high school.

The Matura students are bilingual in German and Italian. They have a high level of English and can achieve a high level of French and/or Latin. The high school offers two profiles, with students choosing between a major in economics and law and a major in physics and applications of mathematics.

Graduates of the Swiss School of Rome study regularly at renowned universities in various countries.

Diplomas 
The educational goal of all students is the Swiss Matura exam. It provides access to all colleges and universities in Switzerland. For the admission to universities it is equivalent to the Italian Esame di Stato, and therefore it also offers access not only to all Italian universities but also to all universities in the European Union.

In addition, the school offers its students access to the Italian school system. Pupils take the “esame di idoneità” at the end of primary school (esame di idoneità al termine del quinto anno di scuola primaria, ai fini dell'ammissione al successivo grado d'istruzione) and the “licenza media” (esame di Stato conclusivo del primo ciclo d’istruzione) at the end of the middle school.

Pedagogical principles 
The Swiss School of Rome guides its students to personal maturity in the cultural, social, economic and political spheres of life. It promotes the development of each student by teaching basic knowledge, various forms of expression and different working methods, integrating physical and artistic education according to the Swiss pedagogical model, which goes back to Johann Heinrich Pestalozzi’s basic concept: learning with head, heart and hand. The school encourages adolescents to develop their independence, an authentic sense of responsibility, social skills and critical thinking, placing values such as mutual respect, solidarity and tolerance at the heart of its educational work.

The Swiss School Rome is a place where different cultures meet. It is shaped on the one hand by teaching most subjects in German and by the curricula of the Canton of St. Gallen, and on the other hand by the culture of the host country Italy and the cultural diversity of the school community which includes people from about 20 different nationalities.

Teaching languages 
From the kindergarten level on, the students grow naturally into the German language, which is the main language in the following school levels. In primary school, in addition to the Swiss curricula, the children learn Italian to take into account the goals of the Italian educational system. From the third school year onwards, English is added as a third language.

In middle school, in the sixth school year, French is added as a fourth language, and in high school, from the ninth school year, students can additionally take Latin as an elective.

Students achieve a high level of proficiency in all four school languages, which is certified by external language examinations.

Alumni Association 
On the celebration for the 75th anniversary of the school, an alumni association was founded with the aim to create a network of the alumni of the Swiss School of Rome.

History and governance 
The school was founded in 1946 by members of the Swiss community in Rome, who were looking for a suitable and future-oriented education for their children after the collapse of Italian fascism. It is currently one of 18 Swiss schools abroad that have joined in the umbrella organization Educationsuisse. It is officially recognized both in Switzerland  and in Italy.

The school is neutral from a political and religious point of view. The Federal Department of Home Affairs, through the Federal Office of Culture, exercises the financial supervision, while the Canton of St. Gallen, as patron canton, is responsible for the pedagogy and curricula. The association “Swiss School Rome” is the body that runs the school in the narrow sense of the term. Every three years, the members of the association elect a board of directors, which – together with the principal – is responsible for the strategic management of the school.

References

External links
  Swiss School of Rome

Roma
International schools in Rome
Educational institutions established in 1946
1946 establishments in Italy